Acrocercops panacifinens is a moth of the family Gracillariidae. It is known from New Zealand. In 2019 Robert Hoare proposed that this species be provisionally assigned to the genus Eumetriochroa. However as this proposal needs further investigation this species is also currently known as Eumetriochroa (s.l.) panacifinens.

The wingspan is about 10 mm for females and 8 mm for males.

The larvae feed on Pseudopanax arboreus and probably P. colensoi. They mine the leaves of their host plant. The mine is a simple gallery, white in colour, on the upper surface of the leaf. It increases in width very gradually. The larva on hatching burrows immediately into the leaf, and heads in a more or less of a straight line till the margin or midrib of the leaf is encountered, after which this obstacle is closely followed. Its course invariably takes it close around the greater portion or entire margin of the leaf, closely following the digitations and any incursions made by other insects, and also along one or both of the sides of the midrib, this forming a barrier only in its basal three-quarters. The gallery then follows a more or less tortuous course within these boundaries. If the leaf is large it will rarely cross earlier parts of its own track, and will wander in a vermiform manner along one half of the leaf, generally that half opposite the one on which the egg was laid. In smaller leaves, almost the entire upper surface will be mined in a very complicated manner, but there is never any tendency to blotch formation. Loops may be thrown out from the straight central portion of the gallery against the midrib, but never blind branches. The frass is black, very finely granular, and is irregularly distributed. As a rule it is deposited at the margins of the mine, alternately on either side in the early parts, but later is arranged in close curved lines, convex forwards, transversely across the gallery. In the final stages it tends to become somewhat fluid in character.

References

External links
The Leaf Mining Insects of New Zealand

panacifinens
Moths of New Zealand
Moths described in 1920